Phillip Burton (June 1, 1926 – April 10, 1983) was an American politician and attorney who served as a United States representative from California from 1964 until his death in 1983. A Democrat, he was instrumental in creating the Golden Gate National Recreation Area. Burton was one of the first members of Congress to acknowledge the need for AIDS research and introduce an AIDS bill. He was the husband of Congresswoman Sala Burton, and brother of California State Senator and Congressman John Burton.

Early years and education 
Burton was born in Cincinnati, Ohio, the son of Mildred (Leonard) and Thomas Burton, who was a salesman and physician. He attended Washington High School in Milwaukee, Wisconsin, and graduated from George Washington High School in the Richmond District of San Francisco, in 1944. He earned a B.A. from the University of Southern California in 1947 and an LL.B. from Golden Gate College School of Law in 1952.

Career 
Burton worked as a lawyer and was admitted to practice before the United States Supreme Court in 1956. He was a member of the United States Air Force during both World War II and the Korean War.

Burton was elected to the California State Assembly in November 1956, and served there from 1957 to 1964. In 1959 he represented the United States at the Atlantic Treaty Association Conference in France.

U.S. Congress 
Burton, as a Democrat, won a special election in February 1964 to fill the U.S. House of Representatives vacancy caused by the resignation of John F. Shelley, who was elected mayor of San Francisco. Burton was reelected to the 10 succeeding Congresses (February 18, 1964 – April 10, 1983). In 1965, Burton was one of only 3 members of the House to vote against appropriations that President Lyndon B. Johnson requested for the Vietnam War.

Burton was a delegate to the California State Democratic convention from 1968 to 1982. He was also a delegate to the Democratic National Convention in 1968 and 1972. At the 1968 convention, he was a part of the delegation pledged to Robert F. Kennedy, who was assassinated after winning the California Democratic Primary in June.

In 1973, Burton allowed a bill to go to the floor without a "closed rule"—a stipulation that there could be no amendments proposed to it—for the first time since the 1920s. The ending of the closed rule created an infusion of federal lobbyists at the Capitol building; the lobbyists targeted members of Congress to add funding for lobbyists' favorite projects into bills. For this reason, David Frum wrote that Burton "created the modern Congress" more than anyone else.

After the Democrats gained a strong majority in 1974, he was successful in getting the House to abolish the House Un-American Activities Committee. Burton was supported by labor unions and championed union activists, supporting the activities of the farm workers union and the coal miners union.

When President Gerald Ford appeared before Congress in 1975 to request aid during a refugee crisis in the Vietnamese and Cambodian capitals, Burton became so upset with Ford's request that he called it "an outrage" and left halfway through the speech. In December 1976, Burton narrowly lost a bid for House Majority Leader to Jim Wright of Fort Worth, Texas, by a vote of 148 to 147.

He was the author of the bill that created the Golden Gate National Recreation Area and legislation setting up wilderness areas across the country. He sponsored a law that substantially enlarged Redwood National Park in 1987. The Point Reyes National Seashore includes the Phillip Burton Wilderness, named for the congressman in 1985. In the early 1980s, he worked with gay liaison Bill Kraus to create legislation and funding for AIDS research in the San Francisco area. He also was instrumental in establishing the position of non-voting representative from Guam, the Virgin Islands, and American Samoa.

Death and legacy
Burton died on April 10, 1983, in San Francisco at age 56, of a ruptured abdominal aortic aneurysm. He was cremated, and the ashes were interred in the National Cemetery of the Presidio of San Francisco. His wife Sala Burton won a special election in June 1983 to serve the remainder of his term. She was elected to full terms in 1984 and 1986. Burton's House seat was later held by Nancy Pelosi, who won a special election in 1987, following Sala Burton's death.

There is a statue of Burton at the Great Meadow at Fort Mason, in the Golden Gate Recreation Area. San Francisco's federal building is named for Burton. Phillip & Sala Burton High School, in San Francisco on the site of the former Woodrow Wilson High School, is named for Burton and his wife.

In popular culture
He was portrayed by Dakin Matthews in HBO's 1993 film And the Band Played On.

See also
 List of United States Congress members who died in office (1950–99)

References

Further reading
Jacobs, John. A Rage for Justice: The Passion and Politics of Phillip Burton. Berkeley: University of California Press, 1995.
Robinson, Judith. You're in Your Mother's Arms: The Life and Legacy of Congressman Phil Burton. San Francisco, CA: M.J. Robinson, 1994.
Nies, Judith. The Girl I Left Behind: A Personal History of the 1960s. New York: Harper Perennial, 2009. (Memoir of a congressional staffer working with anti-war Congressmen.)

External links
 Retrieved on 2008-07-20

 Finding Aid to the Phillip Burton Papers, 1945-1986, The Bancroft Library

|-

|-

|-

1926 births
1983 deaths
20th-century American politicians
Golden Gate University School of Law alumni
Democratic Party members of the California State Assembly
Democratic Party members of the United States House of Representatives from California
Politicians from Cincinnati
Politicians from Milwaukee
Politicians from San Francisco
Military personnel from Ohio
United States Army Air Forces personnel of World War II
United States Air Force personnel of the Korean War
United States Air Force airmen
United States Army soldiers
University of Southern California alumni